Xian is a Chinese surname. Its romanizations in Cantonese and Old Chinese are Haam and Ham or Hahm respectively.

It could refer to the surname 冼 which was chosen to replace the rare character surname Shan  which cannot be displayed on a computer with normal coding. Two hundred people from  Gaozhuang Village in Mudan District, Heze, Shandong were affected although people who already registered with their original name were allowed to keep it.

Origin
Di Ku (帝嚳) the Gaoxin (高辛)'s posterity get surname Xian (咸). 
during the Shang Dynasty, Astronomer Wu Xian (巫咸) get surname with Given name the Xian (咸). 
during the Emperor Yao, Si (姒) family get surname Xian (咸). 
in territory of Chu (state), Mi (芈) family get surname Xian (咸).
during the Zhou Dynasty in Jin (晋), Ji (姬) family get surname Xian (咸).
during the Han Dynasty, Hui people (回) get surname Xian (咸).
during the Qing Dynasty in Liaoning, Khitan (契丹) get surname Xian (咸).  
Various Chinese Minority use surname Xian (咸).

Notable people
 Lady Xian (512–602), noblewoman of the Li people born to the chieftain of the Xian tribe in Southern China
 Ah Xian (born 1960), Chinese-Australian artist
 He Zi Xian (born 1976), Chinese Grand Prix motorcycle racer
 Jia Xian, Chinese mathematician from Kaifeng of the Song dynasty
 Old Xian, artist based in Hangzhou, China
 Wang Xian (sport shooter) (born 1978), Chinese Olympic sport shooter
 Sim Woh Kum (冼松锦 xiǎn sōngjǐn; c. 1933 – 27 July 1973), Singaporean convicted murderer

See also
Ham (surname), Korean version
Xian (disambiguation), including other people with the name Xian
Hui people
Khitan people
Mandarin Chinese
Chinese Minority
Xianyang, city in Shaanxi

References

Chinese-language surnames
Individual Chinese surnames